Zhulanikha is a rural locality (a selo) in Zarinsky District, Altai Krai, Russia. The population was 695 as of 2016. There are 12  streets.

History 
In 1921, anti-Bolshevik anarchist partisans under I. P. Novoselov were based at Zhulanikha, from where they took part in the peasant rebellion of Sorokino.

Geography 
Zhulanikha is located 62 km east of Zarinsk (the district's administrative centre) by road. Zyryanovka is the nearest rural locality.

References 

Rural localities in Zarinsky District